Amalia may refer to:

People 
Amalia (given name), feminine given name (includes a list of people so named)
Princess Amalia (disambiguation), several princesses with this name

Films and television series 

Amalia (1914 film), the first full-length Argentine film
Amalia (1936 film), an Argentine remake of the 1914 movie
Amália (film), a 2008 Portuguese film biography of singer Amália Rodrigues
Amalia (TV series), a South African television series
Amalia Sheran Sharm, one of the main protagonists in Wakfu (TV series)

Places
Amalia, New Mexico, US
Amalia, North West, South Africa

Other uses 
Amalia (novel), an Argentine novel written by José Mármol
Amalia (Schubert), D 195, Op. 173 No. 1, song by Franz Schubert, based on a text by Schiller
Amalia (steamship), a general cargo steamship built by J&G Thomson for the Papayanni Brothers in 1861
284 Amalia, a large main belt asteroid
Laelia, a genus of orchids, formerly called AMALIA)

See also
 Amalie (disambiguation)
 Amélie (disambiguation)